At Night We Live is the fifth and final studio album by American alternative rock band Far released on May 25, 2010. A few different pre-order packages were available, 500 of which included a limited-edition colored double LP.

The title track, according to frontman Jonah Matranga, was inspired by a dream he had, shortly following a hospital visit to see Deftones bassist Chi Cheng after he sustained severe brain trauma in a traffic accident.

Track listing

The European version also contains a cover version of PJ Harvey's "Long Snake Moan" from the album To Bring You My Love as track #13, plus one yet-unknown song at #12. "Pony", which is a Ginuwine cover, is not listed on the European version but appears as track #14.

Personnel
Jonah Matranga - vocals, guitar
Shaun Lopez - guitar
John Gutenberger - bass guitar
Chris Robyn - drums

Critical reception

The album was released to a positive reception by critics. As of August 2010, the album has received a 'Universal Acclaim' score of 82 on Metacritic.

Alternative Press stated, "It truly does feel as if they've been holding this emotion back since the day they parted and now unleashing everything in an explosion of creative energy, delivering a magnificent record that while fresh and exciting, could only be the work of far." BBC Music were equally full of praise; "At Night We Live is the best and the most confident album of their two-part career. It is also, admittedly, more commercial-sounding, but there’s no shame in that if it’s done with integrity, dignity and passion."

Allmusic were among those more reserved in their review, suggesting, "Perhaps the real issue here is that in their absence, the sound Far helped to push into the mainstream is now so common that they don’t feel as special as they once were. Fans of Far will be able to appreciate At Night We Live as a further evolution of Water & Solutions, but new listeners will have a hard time finding a fresh experience."

References 

2010 albums
Far (band) albums